Harry Parsons may refer to:
 Harry Parsons (Australian footballer)
 Harry Parsons (English footballer)

See also
 Henry Parsons (disambiguation)